Wyevale (Boker Field) Airport  is located  east of Wyevale, Ontario, Canada.

References

Registered aerodromes in Ontario